Bucculatrix tenebricosa is a moth in the family Bucculatricidae. It is found in North America, where it has been recorded from Utah. The species was described by Annette Frances Braun in 1925.

References

Natural History Museum Lepidoptera generic names catalog

Bucculatricidae
Moths described in 1925
Moths of North America
Taxa named by Annette Frances Braun